Sergei Konstantinovich Tumansky (– 9 September 1973) was a designer of Soviet aircraft engines and the chief designer in the Tumansky Design Bureau, OKB-300. He worked in TsIAM (1931–38 and in 1940), and at the aircraft-engine plant N 29, in Zaporozhye.

He also worked as a substitute main designer in OKB A.A. Mikulin beginning in 1943.

Biography

Sergei Tumansky was born in Minsk, the Russian Empire, on May 21, 1901 and died, at age 73, in Moscow, the Soviet Union, on September 9, 1973.

Tumansky was a specialist in the field of mechanics and machine building. He was a corresponding member of the Soviet Academy of Sciences for the department of mechanics and control processes from 26 June 1964, and then academician for the department of mechanics and control processes (machine building) from 26 November 1968. He was awarded different distinctions, among them Lenin Prize, Lenin Order and Hero of Socialist Labour.

Contributions

Some of the engines he worked on and/or designed include:

 M-75 - Gnome-Rhône 9K Mistral built under license
 M-85 - Gnome-Rhône 14K Mistral Major built under license
 M-86 - higher power version of M-85 with increased supercharging and a higher compression ratio
 Tumansky M-87 - improved M-86 with more power
 Tumansky M-88 - improved M-87 with more power
 Tumansky M-89
 Tumansky M-90 - prototype two-row, 18 cylinder version of M-75; cancelled in 1944 as it was too underpowered and suffered numerous failures
 Tumansky M-92 - prototype development of M-90, 1943
 Tumansky RD-9 - initially known as Mikulin AM-5, renamed to RD-9 when Tumansky took over development
 Tumansky RD-10 - designation given to captured examples and copies of the Junkers Jumo 004
 Tumansky R-11 - a twin-spool, axial-flow non-afterburning turbojet engine
 Tumansky R-13 - a twin-spool, axial-flow afterburning turbojet engine designed by Sergei Alekseevich Gavrilov, developed from the R-11
 Tumansky R-15 - an axial-flow, single shaft afterburning turbojet
 Tumansky R-21 - projected twin-spool, axial-flow afterburning turbojet based on the R-11
 Tumansky R-25 - a twin-spool, axial-flow afterburning turbojet engine, the ultimate development of the Tumansky R-11
 Tumansky R-29

Awards
 Hero of Socialist Labour (1957)
 Lenin Prize winner (1957)
 Gospremii of the USSR (1946)
 Honorary Citizen Kuybyshev (1982)
 Order of Lenin (4 times)
 Order of the October Revolution
 Order of the Red Star

See also
 Nikolai Dmitriyevich Kuznetsov

External links
 Туманский Сергей Константинович 
 Биография.ру | Biografija.ru | Т | Туманский Сергей Константинович 

Soviet aerospace engineers
Soviet mechanical engineers
Full Members of the USSR Academy of Sciences
1901 births
1973 deaths
 
Soviet inventors
Heroes of Socialist Labour
People from Minsk
Baranov Central Institute of Aviation Motors employees